In the English law of tort loss of right is a new heading of potential liability arising as a matter of policy to counteract limitations perceived in the more traditional rules of causation.

Notes

References
Cane, Peter. (1999). Atiyah’s Accidents, Compensation and the Law. Sixth edition, Chapter 5. Cambridge: Cambridge University Press. 
Deakin, Simon; Johnston, Angus & Markesinis, B. S. (2003). Markesinis and Deakin's Tort Law. pp. 174–201. Oxford: Clarendon Press.  
Hart, H. L. A. & Honore, A. M. (1985). Causation in the Law. Oxford: Clarendon Press.
Luckham, Mary. "Informed consent to medical treatment and the issue of causation: the decision of the House of Lords in Chester v Afshar [2004] UKHL 41" 
Rogers, W. V. H. Winfield and Jolowicz on Tort, pp. 195–231. London: Sweet & Maxwell. 
Stevens, Robert. An Opportunity to Reflect 
Failure To Warn 
Weir, Tony. (2002). Tort Law. Chapters 4 & 5. Oxford: Oxford University Press. 

English tort law